The swarthy gerbil (Gerbillus aquilus) is distributed mainly in eastern Iran, southern Afghanistan, and western Pakistan.

References

 

Gerbillus
Mammals of Asia
Mammals of Afghanistan
Mammals of Pakistan
Gerbil, Swarthy
Mammals described in 1972